A retrospective looks back at events that have taken place.

Retrospective or A Retrospective may also refer to:

Music
 Retrospective album, a one-artist compilation album of musical works

Albums
 Retrospective: The Best of Buffalo Springfield, 1969
 Retrospective: The Music of Mad Men, 2015
 Retrospective (Rosanne Cash album), 1995 compilation
 Retrospective (Ghoti Hook album), by Ghoti Hook
 Retrospective (Indigo Girls album)
 Retrospective: 1995–2005 by Natalie Merchant
 Retrospective (Monkey House album), 2013
 Retrospective (Russell Morris album), 1978
 Retrospective, 1990 by Poco
 Retrospective (Red House Painters album)
 Retrospective (Rinôçérôse album), 1997
 Retrospective I, by Rush
 Retrospective II, by Rush
 Retrospective III: 1989–2008, by Rush
 Retrospective EPs, by Keane
 Retrospective (X Marks the Pedwalk album)
 Retrospective (Bunny Wailer album), 1995
 Retrospective (Leaether Strip album)
 Retrospective 2, by Sevendust
 A Retrospective (KRS-One album)
 A Retrospective (EP), a 2004 EP by Pamela Moore
 A Retrospective (Lou Reed album)
 A Retrospective (Saetia album), 2001
 A Retrospective (Lynyrd Skynyrd album)
 A Retrospective (Pink Martini album), 2011
 A Retrospective, a 1977 album by Linda Ronstadt
 A Retrospective: 1995–2000, by Son Volt

Other uses
Retrospective, a section of the Berlin International Film Festival

See also
 Retrospective aspect or perfect aspect, in linguistics
 Retrospective diagnosis